The Wolfe Islander IV is a zero emission ferry boat which will serve between Kingston, Ontario and Wolfe Island, thus replacing the MV Wolfe Islander III. The MV Wolfe Islander IV was constructed with another ferry, the Amherst Islander II, using the same zero emission technology and which will serve between Amherst Island  and Millhaven, Ontario.

The Wolfe Islander IV was built at the Damen Galați shipyard in Romania. It is anticipated to be brought into service in Q2 2022.

References

Zero-emissions vehicles
Ferries of Ontario
Ships built in Romania